Seki may refer to:

Places
 Seki, Gifu, a city in Japan
 Seki River, a river in Japan
 Şəki, a city and provincial capital in Azerbaijan
 Şəki (village), a village and municipality in Azerbaijan
 Šeki, a small town in Slovenia
 Seki, Bismil
 Seki, Ilgaz, a village in Turkey
 Seki, İskilip
 Seki, Osmancık
 Seki, Tavas

Other uses
 Seki, a term in the game of Go
SEKI, an acronym for Sequoia and Kings Canyon National Parks in California
Sushi Seki, a Japanese sushi restaurant in New York City

People with the surname
 Deniz Seki (born 1970), Turkish female pop singer
 Hajime Seki (1873–1935), Japanese politician
, Japanese ice hockey player
, Japanese handball player
 Kiyohide Seki (1851–1927), Japanese politician
, Imperial Japanese Navy officer
, Japanese table tennis player
, Japanese cyclist
, Japanese gymnast
 Seki Takakazu, 17th-century Japanese mathematician
, Japanese actor and voice actor
 , Japanese actor, voice actor, and singer
 , Japanese actor, voice actor, singer and narrator
 Tsutomu Seki, Japanese astronomer
, Japanese boxer
 Lieutenant Yukio Seki (関 行男), the pilot who led the first attack of a Kamikaze unit

See also
Sheki (disambiguation)
Şəkili (disambiguation)
Guān (surname), written 関

Japanese-language surnames